Wesley Baynes (born 12 October 1988) is an English semi-professional footballer who plays for Runcorn Town.

Career
Born in Chester, Baynes came through the ranks at Wrexham, and made his first-team debut in a 2–2 home draw against Chester City in November 2007. After impressing in his first season, he signed an extension to his contract in March 2008, keeping him at the club until 2010. He scored his first goals for the club in the 4–2 away win against Lincoln City in May 2008 which was Wrexham's last match before relegation from the Football League. On 7 January 2009, Baynes handed in a transfer request amid rumours of interest from top clubs

In June 2011 he joined his hometown club Chester. Wes scored his first goal for Chester in the 3–0 victory over Worksop Town scoring the final goal in the 90th minute. He scored his second goal for Chester in the 3–0 victory over Chorley, scoring the 3rd goal from 30 yards. Baynes scored four more goals for Chester in their back-to-back title winning season, scoring the first goal in the 2–1 victory over Marine. He also scored Chester's only goal in the 1–1 draw against Northwich Victoria but his joy was soon to be cut short after being sent off later in the game. His fifth and sixth goal came in Chester's 4–0 win over Buxton.

In May 2013 it was announced that Baynes rejected the chance to stay with Chester for another season but this time in the Conference National. Instead he joined recently relegated AFC Telford United where he would be playing in the Conference North for another season. On 26 April 2014 he won promotion to the Conference Premier with Telford after they clinched the Conference North title on the final game of the season.

In late September 2014 he joined Colwyn Bay on loan and subsequently permanently, before signing for Connah's Quay Nomads in the Welsh Premier League.

In May 2015, Baynes scored the only goal in the Europa League play-off final against Airbus UK Broughton that sent Nomads into Europe for the first time in their history.

After spending two years with the club he signed for Airbus UK in the summer of 2017. In January 2018, he returned to the Welsh Premier with Llandudno.

At the end of the season, he was released by Llandudno and signed for Aberystwyth. Baynes made his Aberystwyth debut on the opening day of the season in a 2–0 win over former club Llandudno.

In June 2020, Baynes signed for Flint Town United.

He then signed in 2021 for Cymru North side Prestatyn Town.

In November 2021 he moved to Runcorn Town.

Career statistics

References

External links

1988 births
Living people
English footballers
Association football defenders
English Football League players
Wrexham A.F.C. players
Altrincham F.C. players
National League (English football) players
Chester F.C. players
Northern Premier League players
AFC Telford United players
Colwyn Bay F.C. players
Connah's Quay Nomads F.C. players
Llandudno F.C. players
Cymru Alliance players
Cymru Premier players
Aberystwyth Town F.C. players
Flint Town United F.C. players
Runcorn Town F.C. players
North West Counties Football League players
Prestatyn Town F.C. players
Airbus UK Broughton F.C. players